Marek Seweryn (born 17 October 1957 in Katowice) is a Polish weightlifter.

References

 Sports-reference.com
 Top Olympic Lifters of the 20th Century
 Marek Seweryn's homepage

1957 births
Living people
Olympic bronze medalists for Poland
Olympic weightlifters of Poland
Polish male weightlifters
Weightlifters at the 1980 Summer Olympics
Weightlifters at the 1988 Summer Olympics
Sportspeople from Katowice
Olympic medalists in weightlifting
Medalists at the 1980 Summer Olympics
European Weightlifting Championships medalists
World Weightlifting Championships medalists
20th-century Polish people
21st-century Polish people